Stephen Boyd (born William Millar; 4 July 1931 – 2 June 1977) was a Northern Irish actor. He appeared in some 60 films, most notably as the villainous Messala in Ben-Hur (1959), a role that earned him the Golden Globe Award for Best Supporting Actor – Motion Picture. He received his second  Golden Globe Award nomination for Billy Rose's Jumbo (1962). He also appeared, sometimes as a hero and sometimes as a malefactor, in the major big-screen productions Les bijoutiers du clair de lune (1958), The Bravados (1958), Imperial Venus (1962), The Fall of the Roman Empire (1964), Genghis Khan (1965), Fantastic Voyage (1966) and Shalako (1968).

Biography

Early life
Stephen Boyd was born on 4 July 1931 in Glengormley, County Antrim, in a house on the Doagh Road, Whitehouse. He was the youngest of nine siblings born to Irish-Canadian parents, James Alexander Millar and his wife Martha Boyd. At a very early age, William, or Billy as he was known, moved with the family to live in Glengormley. Boyd attended the local Public Elementary School and Ballyclare High School.

At the age of 14 Boyd quit school to work and earn money to help support his family. He eventually joined the Ulster Group Theatre where he learned the behind-the-scenes tasks of the theatre. He became well known in Belfast for his contributions as a gravel-voiced policeman on the Ulster Radio programme "The McCooeys", the story of a Belfast family written by Joseph Tomelty. 

Boyd eventually worked his way up to character parts and then starring roles. By nineteen he had toured Canada with summer stock companies. In 1950, he made a coast-to-coast tour of America with the Clare Tree Major Company, performing A Streetcar Named Desire  in the lead role as Stanley Kowalski. Boyd later recalled this as "the best performance I ever gave in my life".

By the time he was 20, Boyd had a wide range of theatre experience, but he longed for the big stage. In 1952, he moved to London and worked in a cafeteria and busked outside a cinema in Leicester Square to get money as he was literally close to starvation. Boyd caught his first break as a doorman at the Odeon Theatre. 

The Leicester Square Cinema across the street recruited him to usher attendees during the British Academy Awards in the early 1950s. During the awards ceremony he was noticed by actor Sir Michael Redgrave, who used his connections to introduce Boyd to the director of the Windsor Repertory Group. At this point Boyd's stage career in the U.K. began to flourish with performances in "The Deep Blue Sea" and "Barnett's Folly"

Early roles
Boyd's first role which brought him acclaim was as a pro-Nazi Irish spy in the movie The Man Who Never Was, based on the book by Ewen Montagu. The movie was released in April 1956.

Shortly thereafter he signed a ten-year contract with 20th Century Fox studios, who began prepping him for Hollywood. But it was a while until Boyd actually set foot on a Hollywood back-lot. Boyd's next stop was Portugal to make A Hill in Korea, which also featured future stars Michael Caine and Robert Shaw. In June 1956, Boyd was cast in the nautical, ship-wreck adventure Abandon Ship! for Columbia Studios starring Tyrone Power. This was filmed in the summer of 1956 in London where the British Navy  built a huge 35,000 gallon water tank for the movie.

In November 1956, for Twentieth Century Fox, Boyd traveled to the British West Indies as part of a large ensemble cast in Darryl Zanuck's racially provocative film Island in the Sun starring Dorothy Dandridge, based on the Alec Waugh novel. Boyd portrayed a young English aristocrat who becomes the lover of Joan Collins. Boyd was loaned out to the J. Arthur Rank production of Seven Thunders (Beast of Marseilles), a World War II romance set in Nazi-occupied Marseilles. This movie was filmed on location in Marseilles and at Pinewood Studios in London in the spring of 1957 and featured Boyd in his most prominent starring film role yet.

Around the same time French actress Brigitte Bardot was given the opportunity to cast her own leading man in her next movie after her success in Roger Vadim's And God Created Woman, and she chose Boyd. From August to October 1957, Bardot, Boyd and Alida Valli filmed the lusty romance The Night Heaven Fell, directed by Roger Vadim in Paris and in the region of Málaga, Spain, specifically the small, white-washed town of Mijas. Being in the Bardot spotlight added much to Boyd's film credit, in addition to bringing him notice in Hollywood.

Boyd finally arrived in Hollywood in January 1958 to take on his first true Hollywood role as the leader of a quartet of renegade outlaws in the Twentieth Century Fox western The Bravados, which starred Gregory Peck and Joan Collins. Even though this was a Hollywood production, the actual filming took place in Morelia, Mexico.

Ben-Hur
After the filming of The Bravados was complete in late March 1958, Stephen Boyd returned to Hollywood to audition for the coveted role of Messala in MGM's upcoming epic Ben-Hur. Many other actors, including Victor Mature, Kirk Douglas, Leslie Nielsen and Stewart Granger had been considered for the part, but Boyd's screen test convinced director William Wyler that he had found the perfect villain for his epic, as Wyler had also admired Boyd's performance in The Man Who Never Was the previous year. Boyd was hurried off to join actor Charlton Heston in Rome in May 1958 to learn the chariot racing aspect of his role. Heston had already been practicing behind the chariot for weeks, so Boyd needed to learn quickly. Boyd was also required to wear brown contact lenses as Messala, which irritated his eyes and caused vision problems for a few months after the movie was completed. Despite this, Boyd described the filming experience of Ben-Hur (which took place in Cinecittà Studios in Rome), as the most exciting experience of his life.

Years after the movie was released, interim Ben-Hur screenwriter and novelist Gore Vidal revealed that Boyd had portrayed his famous character Messala in Ben-Hur with an underlying homosexual energy, as instructed to by Vidal when he greets Judah Ben-Hur (Charlton Heston) in the opening sequence. In Gore Vidal's autobiography Palimpsest: A Memoir Vidal describes his discussion first with director Wyler, concerning Messala's underlying motivation, namely that Messala and Judah Ben-Hur had previously been lovers. This was based on an idea by Vidal to enhance the tension between the two main antagonists. Wyler specifically told Vidal, "You talk to Boyd. But don't you say a word to Chuck or he'll fall apart." In Palimpsest, Vidal said, "Over the next few years, whenever we met (William Wyler), we quarreled amiably over what I had put in the scene and what Steven Boyd is clearly playing."  Vidal later came into conflict with actor Charlton Heston about his version of the Messala/Ben-Hur relationship and the implications surrounding Ben-Hur.

After the filming of Ben-Hur was completed Boyd returned to Hollywood in early 1959 to star with Academy Award winner Susan Hayward in the Canadian-based drama Woman Obsessed. Some advertisements for this movie labeled Boyd as "The Young New Clark Gable."  He was then part of another excellent ensemble cast in the adaptation of Rona Jaffe's novel The Best of Everything, filmed in May and June 1959 at Fox Studios in Hollywood and on location in New York City.

Ben-Hur was released in November 1959 and immediately made Boyd an international star. His portrayal of the Roman tribune Messala brought in rave reviews. Press columnist Erskine Johnson wrote, "A brass hat and the armor of a Roman warrior in Ben-Hur does for Stephen Boyd what a tight dress does for Marilyn Monroe." Ruth Waterbury, in her Boyd feature in the Pittsburgh Post-Gazette, described Boyd's character as "the dangerously masculine and quite magnificent Messala." Modern Screen magazine in 1960 stated that Boyd's  ruthless Messala had "lost the chariot race but captured the sympathy and sex appeal of Ben-Hur."

1960s
Boyd was featured in the popular TV program This Is Your Life on 3 February 1960, which featured many of Boyd's family members and acquaintances (including Michael Redgrave) telling stories about his early life and film career. This should be some indication of how "Stephen Boyd fever" was catching. Newspaper columnists were getting swarmed with letters from female fans of all ages wanting to know more about Boyd. He was being sent dozens of starring roles, most of which he had to turn down due to other obligations. He opted out of the biblical epic The Story of Ruth, which didn't please Fox studios, and he was one of the front-runners to star with Marilyn Monroe in her picture Let's Make Love.

In early 1960, Boyd won the Golden Globe Award for Best Supporting Actor – Motion Picture for his performance in Ben-Hur. In January 1960, Boyd made a guest appearance alongside the silent-era Ben-Hur stars Ramon Novarro and Francis X. Bushman on Hedda Hopper's special television programme Hedda Hopper's Hollywood. In February 1960, he starred in the Playhouse 90 television performance called The Sound of Trumpets with Dolores Hart, which garnered good reviews. He also appeared as a singing guest on The Dinah Shore Chevy Show on 13 March 1960 where he performed two Irish folk songs with Dinah Shore, "The Leprechaun Song"  and "Molly Malone", and an Irish step dance.

Boyd chose to do roles which he felt comfortable in. His next choice was The Big Gamble, which featured Darryl F. Zanuck's current paramour and French icon Juliette Gréco. It was filmed on the Ivory Coast of West Africa, Dublin and the southern part of France in the spring and summer of 1961. The adventure of making this film almost outdid the adventure in the film itself as the crew slept in tents in the jungle that were guarded by natives on parole for cannibalism.  Boyd nearly drowned in the Ardèche river during the making of the film. Luckily he was saved by his co-star and excellent swimmer David Wayne. Boyd spoke about this incident during his appearance on the popular TV programme What's My Line? which aired on 11 December 1960.

Boyd was originally chosen to play Mark Antony opposite Elizabeth Taylor in 20th Century Fox's epic production of Cleopatra (1963) under the direction of Rouben Mamoulian. He began film work in September 1960 but eventually withdrew from the problem-plagued production after Elizabeth Taylor's severe illness postponed the film for months. (Cleopatra was later directed by Joseph L. Mankiewicz, and the role of Mark Antony went to Richard Burton.) During this period of waiting in April 1961 Stephen Boyd was sent to Cairo, Egypt on a publicity tour by Twentieth Century Fox along with fellow actors Julie Newmar and Barbara Eden to attend the inaugural ceremony of the sound and light show at the pyramids of Giza.

After several months without active work, Boyd was thrilled to finally get his first post-Cleopatra role. The film was The Inspector, renamed Lisa for the American release. It was based on the novel by Jan de Hartog and co- starred actress Dolores Hart. The film was made in Amsterdam, London and Wales during the summer of 1961. On 9 January 1962, Boyd was featured in a television film from General Electric Theater called The Wall Between, co-starring Ronald Reagan and Gloria Talbott.  Next, Boyd was again loaned out to MGM Studios to star with Doris Day in the circus musical Billy Rose's Jumbo, filmed during the early part of 1962; the role earned Boyd a nomination for the Golden Globe Award for Best Actor – Motion Picture Musical or Comedy.

Boyd flew to Rome in the summer of 1962 to act with Italian superstar Gina Lollobrigida in her long-time pet project Imperial Venus, a romantic epic about the many loves of Pauline Bonaparte, the sister of Napoleon. This film was the first film to be banned by the Motion Picture Association of America for male nudity. Boyd appeared in a humorous bedroom scene, naked with only his lower half covered by a bed-sheet. The suggestion of nudity was too much for the censors and the movie was never released in the United States.  Boyd returned to the States briefly after finishing Imperial Venus, where he appeared for the second time on The Dinah Shore Chevy Show, which aired on 11 November 1962. For this program Boyd was a last-minute replacement for actor James Garner and joined Shore and entertainer Dean Martin for a few musical numbers.

Boyd arrived in Spain in early 1963 to begin work on Samuel Bronston's massive production of theThe Fall of the Roman Empire, directed by Anthony Mann. This was filmed during a severely cold winter in Europe and the production in the Sierra de Guadarrama of Spain encountered several challenges with the snow. Boyd's co-star was another Italian legend, Sophia Loren. Boyd also had the opportunity to ride another chariot in this film. Although the movie did well internationally when it was released in April 1964, it was a box office failure in the United States and signaled the end of Roman epics in the 1960s. More appreciated with the passing of time, The Fall of the Roman Empire was also recognized by critics as being a major inspiration for Ridley Scott's Academy Award-winning movie Gladiator.|

Boyd flew back to Hollywood in the summer to star in a Bob Hope Presents the Chrysler Theatre episode with Louis Jourdan called War of Nerves, which aired on 3 January 1964. He then returned to Europe to film the suspenseful The Third Secret starring Pamela Franklin, Richard Attenborough, Jack Hawkins
and Diane Cilento.

On 23 December 1963, Stephen Boyd became a naturalized U.S. citizen during a ceremony at the Federal Building in Los Angeles, California.

Stephen Boyd was originally cast as the lead in Anthony Mann's World War II drama The Unknown Battle, which was set to film in early 1964 with co-stars Elke Sommer and Anthony Perkins in Norway. After several weeks of waiting, studio funding for the project fell through. Boyd sued Mann for $500,000 for a breach of contract, missed time and other lost film opportunities. The project was completed by Mann a year later and released as Heroes of Telemark with Kirk Douglas replacing Boyd as the lead.

In 1964, Boyd continued to make films in Europe, traveling to Yugoslavia to star as the villain Jamuga in the epic Genghis Khan. Boyd was the top billed and therefore the top paid star in the epic, and this apparently caused friction with up-and-coming star Omar Sharif. After completing Genghis Khan, Boyd trekked to Cairo, Egypt for a brief appearance as the regal King Nimrod at The Tower of Babel in Dino de Laurentiis's production of The Bible, directed by John Huston.

After all this globe-trotting, the travel-weary Boyd was very happy to return to the United States to start work on the Twentieth Century Fox science fiction adventure Fantastic Voyage, co-starring with soon-to-be icon Raquel Welch.  This was filmed in the early part of 1965. In the summer of 1965, Boyd joined German star Elke Sommer and music legend Tony Bennett to film the Hollywood drama The Oscar, based on the eponymous Richard Sale novel. The movie was a popular success, but maligned by film critics. Boyd made a 10-day visit to Iran in December 1965 to film his scenes for the United Nations film project The Poppy Is Also a Flower, written by James Bond creator Ian Fleming.

In 1966, the producer of The Oscar, Joseph Levine, hired Boyd for his next film project, The Caper of the Golden Bulls, based on a William McGivern novel. This movie was partly filmed on location in Spain in the summer of 1966. The actors, including Boyd, took part in the famous Feria del Toro de San Fermin festival in Pamplona (known as the Running of the Bulls).

Also in 1966, Boyd appeared as Nimrod in John Huston's biblical epic The Bible: In the Beginning... (which became the year's second highest-grossing film but lost 20th Century Fox $1.5 million) and also as Charles Grant in the cult classic Fantastic Voyage (which is also notable for launching the career of Raquel Welch).

Next, Boyd starred in a spy thriller Assignment K with Swedish model/actress Camilla Sparv, which was filmed in Germany, Austria and London during February and March 1967. Boyd grew a full beard  for his next role as the iconic Irish playwright and critic George Bernard Shaw in the Off-Broadway play called The Bashful Genius written by Harold Callen. This was Boyd's first return to the stage since the mid-1950s, and the experience for Boyd was immensely rewarding on a personal level. He received excellent reviews for his nuanced performance of the multi-faceted Shaw.  The play had a very brief run during the summer of 1967 in Denver, Philadelphia and Falmouth, Massachusetts.

In early 1968, Boyd was cast as the heavy opposite Sean Connery and Brigitte Bardot in the western adventure Shalako, based on the Louis L'Amour novel. Shalako was filmed in the early part of 1968 in Almería, Spain. After returning to the United States, Boyd took the role of the cruel slave master Nathan MacKay in the Southern "slavesploitation" drama Slaves, also starring Ossie Davis and songstress Dionne Warwick. The film was loosely based on the famous Harriet Beecher Stowe novel Uncle Tom's Cabin. It was filmed during the summer of 1968 at the supposedly haunted Buena Vista plantation near Shreveport, Louisiana. The film was released during the volatile civil rights era and in May 1969 Boyd attended the premiere alongside Dionne Warwick in Baltimore Closely following Slaves, Boyd starred in another story about racial tension, this time a World War II made-for-television drama called Carter's Army (or Black Brigade) which aired in August 1970, featuring a young Richard Pryor.

It was around this time that Boyd began his interest in L. Ron Hubbard's Church of Scientology, which made him one of the first Hollywood stars to be involved in it.  Boyd had always expressed an interest in esoteric religions. In an interview in August 1969 with the Detroit Free Press, Boyd explained that Scientology had helped him through the filming of Slaves, and that to him Scientology was "a process used to make you capable of learning. Scientology is nothing. It means only what you want it to. It is not a church you go to pray, but a church that you go to learn. It is no good unless you apply it. It is the application."  Boyd apparently had been elevated to a Scientology Status of OT 6, a position above that of Clear. Boyd starred in and narrated a Scientology recruiting movie titled Freedom in 1970. A copy of this film can be found at the Library of Congress, but it is not available online via any Scientology resource, which may indicate a falling out Boyd had with Scientology using his name for recruiting purposes. There is no documentation of his later involvement with Scientology after the early 1970s.

1970s
During the 1970s, the demand for Boyd in Hollywood diminished, so he focused his attention on European films and several television pilots and shows. He made three films in Spain with director José Antonio Nieves Conde, including Marta in 1970, The Great Swindle in 1971, and Casa Manchada in 1975. He worked with cult director Romain Gary in the drug thriller Kill! in 1971. Boyd continued to travel to a wide variety of locations to work, including Australia for The Hands of Cormac Joyce in 1972, South Africa for Control Factor and The Manipulator in 1972–1973, Jamaica for the scuba diving adventure The Treasure of Jamaica Reef in 1972, Florida for the television pilot Key West in 1973, and Hawaii in his last acting stint as a guest star on the popular television show Hawaii Five-O in 1977. The episode Up the Rebels was the premiere episode of Hawaii Five-Os tenth season, and it aired after Boyd's death on 15 September 1977. His most critically acclaimed role during the 1970s was as a colourful Irish gangster in the UK crime thriller The Squeeze in 1977.

A letter from film producer Euan Lloyd (who produced such films as Shalako, The Man Called Noon and The Wild Geese), states that "Stephen Boyd was one of the nicest, kindest people I have met in my lifetime, rare in this profession."

Although Boyd spent most of his adult life traveling abroad for film work, he made his permanent home in southern California. At one point in the 1960s, he had three homes there — one above the Sunset Strip, one in Tarzana and another in Palm Springs, where he enjoyed his favorite pastime, golf. He made frequent trips back to his hometown of Belfast in Northern Ireland. to visit his family. On one particular visit to Belfast in 1971, Boyd exclaimed his dismay about the situation in Northern Ireland at that time: "Because of the divisiveness, the potential for displaying to the world all that is good in that lovely land is lost, perhaps even destroyed." Boyd was valued so highly by his native city of Belfast that during his visits he was always given a military escort from the airport to his home for security reasons during The Troubles.

Personal life
Silver Screen Magazine in 1960 wrote this about Boyd:

{{quote|A supreme individualist, like most Irishmen, he has a wonderful actor's face that easily switches from an engaging smile to sinister menace. Far handsomer in person than on the screen ... Stephen Boyd is a lean (180 pounds), well built (six-foot-one) charmer of 31, with a dazzling dimple, light brown curly hair, fair skin and the kind of grey eyes which take on color from what he is wearing. A man of tremendous vitality, a typical Celt, in many roles he veers from humor to anger in the wink of an eye. He dresses conservatively; speaks wittily, and extremely well, though he confesses that he's had almost no formal schooling; is genial and friendly ('I have my brooding hours which wipe that grin off my face').<ref>Silver Screen magazine, June 1960; "Stephen Boyd Sex Appeal + Blarney" by Maxine Block</ref>}}

Journalist Florabel Muir described Boyd's appeal in a feature from 1966. "I would think it has to be his ruggedly masculine good looks. Strong, even craggy features, a wide sympathetic mouth, firm chin, athletic build, wavy dark brown hair, roving 185-lb. frame – all that plus a musical voice and the savoir faire of a much-traveled fellow – his films have taken him to many places in the world, and a rolling stone acquires a high polish."

Boyd was popular with Hollywood columnists, including his friend Hedda Hopper, as well as fellow actors and other members of the entertainment industry because of his charm and sense of humor. "Boyd is the kind of a man who was born to make friends and he has been doing it most of his life...Boyd is a blue-eyed, curly-haired chunk of masculinity, who makes no attempt to hide the fact that he just plain likes people. On the set of Ben-Hur he rarely occupied the fancy portable dressing room set aside for his use. Instead, he spent his time between scenes sitting around and chatting with electricians, carpenters and his fellow actors. He will discuss any subject and enjoys a good argument. He can, like most Irishmen, sprinkle his talk with wit as well as sagacity."

He was first married in 1958 to Italian-born MCA executive Mariella Di Sarzana during the filming of Ben-Hur. They separated after just three weeks. Concerning his short-lived marriage to Sarzana, Boyd explained: "It was my fault. I'm an Irish so-and-so when I'm working. I hadn't been married a week when we both knew we had made a mistake. She is a nice girl but we were just not meant for each other. I suppose I wasn't ready for marriage. Maybe I was still too much of an adolescent." They officially divorced in early 1959. After his divorce Boyd lived as a bachelor for most of his life, dating several prominent Hollywood starlets throughout the 1960s. His secretary Elizabeth Mills was a permanent resident at his Tarzana home during these years, though the two did not marry until 1974.

He had a deep and lasting friendship with actress and French icon Brigitte Bardot with whom he starred in two movies – The Night Heaven Fell in 1958 and Shalako in 1968. During the filming of Shakalo in Almería, Spain, Bardot and Boyd's close relationship and open affection for each other sparked numerous rumors of a possible affair. It even caused Brigitte's husband at the time, Gunter Sachs, to ask for a divorce. In Bardot's autobiography, she described the events and states that Boyd "was never her lover, but a tender and attentive friend." In an interview with Photoplay Film in 1968, Boyd said, "Bardot is always Bardot. She's marvelous. She's an enormous star and she's a unique, marvelous woman. I adore her." Even though both actors denied the affair, the press was "convinced there was a romance afoot, that Brigitte and Boyd openly displayed their affection for each other, but that publication of the report on their romance cooled it."

Boyd also had a close relationship with actress Dolores Hart who describes what was her only romance with a co-star in her autobiography The Ear of the Heart. Boyd eventually rejected her advances, but they remained close friends even after she turned to the cloistered life of a nun in 1963. He visited her in 1966 at the Abbey of Regina Laudis in Connecticut and remained in communication with her until the early 1970s.

Stephen Boyd's most passionate affair seems to have been with Austrian actress Marisa Mell. They met while filming the movie Marta in 1970. Boyd initially dodged Marisa Mell's amorous advances, but during the second film they made together, The Great Swindle, the two became inseparable lovers.Schneider, Andre. Die Feuerblume: Über Marisa Mell und ihre Filme, 2013 They married in a gypsy camp on the outskirts of  Madrid in late 1971. The ceremony included a wrist cutting exchange of blood to seal their bond. The marriage was not considered legal, but Marisa Mell said, "Who cares? In our minds it will be real." According to Marisa Mell, their affair was so intense that while living in Rome they made a trip to the Italian town of Sarsina for a ritual exorcism at the Cathedral of St. Vicinius. Boyd abruptly broke off the affair after the intensity apparently became too much to bear. In early 1972, after Boyd's departure, Mell had this to say about the break-up of their relationship: "We both believe in reincarnation, and we realized we've already been lovers in three different lifetimes, and in each one I made him suffer terribly." For her part, Mell fondly remembered Boyd many years later in her autobiography Cover Love from 1990, dedicating a chapter to their affair.

Boyd's last marriage took place in 1974 to Elizabeth Mills, a secretary at the British Arts Council, whom he had known since 1953. Mills followed Boyd to the United States in the late 1950s and was his personal assistant, friend and confidante for many years before marrying him in the mid-1970s.

Death
Boyd died of a massive heart attack on 2 June 1977 at the age of 45 while playing golf with his wife, Elizabeth Mills, at the Porter Valley Country Club in Northridge, California. He was in talks to play the role of the Regimental Sergeant Major in Euan Lloyd's The Wild Geese before his death. (The role was eventually filled by Jack Watson).

He was cremated and his ashes were interred in Oakwood Memorial Park Cemetery in Chatsworth, California. His wife Elizabeth Mills Boyd was interred with him at the time of her death in 2007. He is also remembered on his parents' grave in the Clandeboye Cemetery, Bangor, Northern Ireland.

Legacy
On 4 July 2018, the Ulster History Circle, a voluntary organisation  which erects plaques across the province of Ulster to celebrate people of achievement, commemorated Stephen Boyd with a blue plaque close to his birthplace  at 'Moygara', Shore Road, Whitehouse (Belfast, Northern Ireland).

Filmography

 Black 13 (1953) as Policeman (uncredited)
 Lilacs in the Spring (1954) as Beaumont's Poolside Companion (uncredited)
 An Alligator Named Daisy (1955) as Albert O'Shannon
 Born for Trouble (1955)
 The Man Who Never Was (1956) as Patrick O'Reilly
 A Hill in Korea (1956) as Pvt. Sims
 Seven Waves Away (1957) as Will McKinley
 Island in the Sun (1957) as Euan Templeton
 Seven Thunders (1957) as Dave
 Les bijoutiers du clair de lune (1958) as Lambert
 The Bravados (1958) as Bill Zachary
 Woman Obsessed (1959) as Fred Carter
 The Best of Everything (1959) as Mike Rice
 Ben-Hur (1959) as Messala
 The Big Gamble (1961) as Vic Brennan
 Lisa (1962) as Peter Jongman
 Jumbo (1962) as Sam Rawlins
 Imperial Venus (1962) as Jules de Canouville
 The Third Secret (1964) as Alex Stedman
 The Fall of the Roman Empire (1964) as Livius
 Genghis Khan (1965) as Jamuga
 The Oscar (1966) as Frank Fane
 The Poppy Is Also a Flower (1966) as Benson
 Fantastic Voyage (1966) as Grant
 The Bible: In the Beginning... (1966) as Nimrod
 The Caper of the Golden Bulls (1967) as Peter Churchman
 Assignment K (1968) as Philip Scott
 Shalako (1968) as Bosky Fulton
 Slaves (1969) as MacKay
 Carter's Army (1970, TV Movie) as Capt. Beau Carter
 Historia de una traición (1971) as Arturo
 Marta (1971) as Don Miguel
 African Story (1971) as Arnold Tiller
 Hannie Caulder (1971) as The Preacher (uncredited)
 The Great Swindle (1971) as Dave Barton
 Kill! Kill! Kill! Kill! (1971) as Brad Killian
 The Devil Has Seven Faces (1972) as León Urrutía, joyero
 The Hands of Cormac Joyce (1972, TV Movie) as Cormac Joyce
 Those Dirty Dogs (1973) as Cpt. Chadwood Willer
 The Big Game (1973) as Leyton van Dyk
 The Man Called Noon (1973) as Rimes
 The Treasure of Jamaica Reef (1974) as Hugo Graham
 The Left Hand of the Law (1975) as Lanza
 L'uomo che sfidò l'organizzazione (1975) as Inspector Stephen McCormick
  (1976) as Bill Ardisson
 Lady Dracula (1977) as Count Dracula (Posthumously)
 The Squeeze (1977) as Vic (Posthumously)
 Women in Hospital (1977) as Dr. Oberhoff (Posthumously)
 Impossible Love (1977) as Alvaro (Posthumously)
 Hawaii Five-O'' (1977, TV Series) as Daniel Costigan (Posthumously)

References

External links

 
 
 
 La page WEB de Stephen BOYD
 Stephen Boyd Blog
 "Stephen Boyd: The Busker Who Became a Screen Idol" BBC News; retrieved 23 July 2011
 "The Man Who Never Was?" Literary Belfast; retrieved 23 July 2011

1931 births
1977 deaths
20th Century Studios contract players
20th-century male actors from Northern Ireland
Best Supporting Actor Golden Globe (film) winners
Burials at Oakwood Memorial Park Cemetery
British actors
Irish people of Canadian descent
Male Western (genre) film actors
Male film actors from Northern Ireland
Naturalized citizens of the United States
Northern Ireland emigrants to the United States
People educated at Ballyclare High School
People from Ballyclare